House of Joy is a Singaporean Mandarin drama series aired on MediaCorp TV Channel 8. The series debuted on 6 November 2006 and was telecast weekday nights at 9pm. It has a total of 20 episodes. It stars Ivy Lee , Chen Hanwei , Cynthia Koh & Edmund Chen as the casts of the series.

In the initial few days of the telecast, numerous viewers provided feedback to the TV station on the drama series. Most questioned the appropriateness of the title House of Joy when there were too many emotional scenes for the character which Ivy Lee portrayed. A spokesperson for the station then replied that the word Joy in the title is derived from the word Huan Le in Chinese which is a combination of the name of the 2 lead characters - Yihuan and Letian.

The series focuses on those who continue to strive on to overcome their financial and social problems despite being debt-ridden.

Synopsis
Zheng Yihuan (Ivy Lee) is at the prime of her life at 33. She has a steady job as a finance company manager, a loving husband Xu Zhiguo (Edmund Chen) and enjoys a harmonious family life. To add to her blissfulness, she is expecting her first child, a long-awaited piece of good news.

As the credit manager of a bank, Yihuan has seen how debts incurred from overspending have broken many families up. Hence she is cautious with spending and offers the same advice to her family. But tragedy struck when she discovered that her own husband has turned to gambling and incurred large amounts of debts, and he even ran away after embezzling company funds. To add to her woes, her mother and two siblings also fell into debt.

With a new born child in tow and insurmountable debts, how will she cope? Always the pillar of strength of her family, can she now face up to reality and continue with life bravely?

Cast
Ivy Lee as Zheng Yihuan
Chen Hanwei as Huang Letian
Cynthia Koh as Zheng Shuangxi, Yihuan's sister
Edmund Chen as Xu Zhiguo
Allan Wu as Zheng Sanji, Yihuan's brother
May Phua as Chen Feifei, Sanji's fiancee/wife
Adam Chen as Zen, Shuangxi's boyfriend
Hong Huifang as Lin Yahao, Yihuan's mother
Jin Yinji as Wang Xiulian, Zhiguo's mother
Ling Lee
Huang Shinan
Yao Wenlong as Ben
Jaime Teo as Tan Ming

Awards

External links
House of Joy Theme Song

Singapore Chinese dramas
2000s Singaporean television series
2006 Singaporean television series debuts
2006 Singaporean television series endings
Channel 8 (Singapore) original programming